Asynchrony is the state of not being in synchronization.

Asynchrony or asynchronous may refer to:

Electronics and computing
 Asynchrony (computer programming), the occurrence of events independent of the main program flow, and ways to deal with such events
 Async/await
 Asynchronous system, a system having no global clock, instead operating under distributed control
 Asynchronous circuit, a sequential digital logic circuit not governed by a clock circuit or signal
 Asynchronous communication, transmission of data without the use of an external clock signal
 Asynchronous cellular automaton, a mathematical model of discrete cells which update their state independently
 Asynchronous operation, a sequence of operations executed out of time coincidence with any event

Other uses
 Asynchrony (game theory), when players in games update their strategies at different time intervals
 Asynchronous learning, an educational method in which the teacher and student are separated in time
 Asynchronous motor, a type of electric motor
 Asynchronous multiplayer, a form of multiplayer gameplay in video games
 Asynchronous muscles, muscles in which there is no one-to-one relationship between stimulation and contraction
 Collaborative editing or asynchronous editing, the practice of groups producing works together through individual contributions

See also
 async (album), 2017 album by Japanese musician and composer Ryuichi Sakamoto